Sidi Allal Tazi is a town in Kénitra Province, Rabat-Salé-Kénitra, Morocco. According to the 2004 census it has a population of 3,140.

References

Populated places in Kénitra Province
Rural communes of Rabat-Salé-Kénitra